I've Been Expecting You is the second studio album by English recording artist Robbie Williams. It was released on 26 October 1998 through Chrysalis Records. The album spawned five singles, including lead single "Millennium", which became Williams' first UK number-one hit.

A critical and major commercial success, it debuted at number one on the UK Albums Chart, marking Williams' second consecutive chart-topper, and has been certified 10× Platinum.

Critical reception

John Bush of AllMusic rated the album four stars out of five, and stated that the album is both a "studied" and "more mature, calculated album" than its predecessor Life Thru a Lens (1997) "from a pop star who's often gloried in being immature and spontaneous." He noted the album "may suffer from comparisons to its excellent predecessor, but it also finds Robbie Williams weathering the sophomore storm quite well." NME rated the album 8/10, saying "boy, what a record" and that Williams' "writing skills have improved enormously". The reviewer also noted the album's "impressive diversity" and concluded that "sure, Robbie's still more Michael Barrymore than Michael Stipe, and he'll never be 'cool' by that constipated, soul-crushingly snobbish James Lavelle definition. But he's a natural-born star and he wants you to love him. I've Been Expecting You provides 12 good reasons why you should."

Success
Williams and Chambers started the writing process of the album in Jamaica in the spring of 1998. I've Been Expecting You was released in October 1998. It debuted at number one on the UK Albums Chart, and went on to become the UK's best selling album for that year. According to the Music Week, the album has sold 2,582,016 copies in the UK as of November 2016, and has been certified 10× Platinum for shipments of 3 million copies, making it Williams' best-selling album in the country.

The album also received attention outside the United Kingdom, particularly in continental Europe and Latin America, and has sold a total of five million copies worldwide. Williams finished album promotion with an extensive European tour in the autumn of 1999. I've Been Expecting You was ranked 91st in a 2005 survey held by British television's Channel 4 to determine the 100 greatest albums of all time.

Singles
 "Millennium", a song which was inspired by John Barry's music from the James Bond film You Only Live Twice, became Williams' first solo number-one single in the United Kingdom when it was released in September 1998, knocking All Saints from the top spot. Williams commented that "Someone had to be knocked off and it may as well be the wife" as Williams and Nicole Appleton were engaged at the time. The song went on to sell over 400,000 copies in the UK being certified Gold by the BPI in November 1998. The song also became a top twenty hit in many European countries as well as in Latin America and Australia.
 "No Regrets", a collaboration with Pet Shop Boys singer Neil Tennant and The Divine Comedy's Neil Hannon, was released as the album's second single in November 1998, reaching number four in the UK Singles Chart, backed with the cover of Adam and the Ants 1981 hit "Antmusic". The song became a substantial hit around the world and went on to sell over 200,000 copies in the United Kingdom, where it was certified Silver in October 2004, almost six years after its original release.
 "Strong", a song written in a hotel in Cologne, Germany, inspired by some of Williams' more manic admirers whom he admitted "scared the living daylights" out of him, was released as the album's third single. The song debuted at number four in the United Kingdom and number nine in New Zealand. The track became a hit, peaking within the top forty around Europe and many other countries around the world.
 "She's the One", a cover of the Karl Wallinger track from the album Egyptology, was a favourite song of Williams' after his time in rehab. The song was released as the album's fourth single, becoming his second number-one hit in the United Kingdom. The song went on to win a number of awards around the world, including a BRIT Award for 'Single of the Year' and a Capital Radio Award for 'Best Single'. The single was released as a double A-side with "It's Only Us", the official theme for EA Sports' video game FIFA 2000. The single sold over 400,000 copies in the UK alone and was certified Gold by the BPI in early 2000. 
 "Win Some Lose Some" was released as the album's fifth and final single in March 2000, with an exclusive release in Australia and New Zealand. The song achieved some success there, and the physical copy of the single has since become a very sought-after item amongst fans.

Lawsuit
In 1998, Williams was sued by Ludlow Publishing over the song "Jesus in a Camper Van" because it lifted lyrics from the Loudon Wainwright III song "I Am the Way", from his album Attempted Mustache. The lyric to "I Am the Way" is as follows: "Every son of God has a little hard luck sometime, especially when he goes around saying he's the way." The lyric to "Jesus in a Camper Van" in question is: "Even the son of God gets it hard sometimes, especially when he goes around, saying I am the way."

Williams claimed that he had heard a young man say the line whilst in rehab, and only found that it was a line from Wainwright's song after he had already recorded it. Williams' agents called Wainwright to notify him about this, but Wainwright had little say in the matter; "I Am the Way" was a parody of the Woody Guthrie song "New York Town"; Ludlow Publishing owned the line's copyright. In 2002, Ludlow Publishing won the lawsuit, receiving 25% of the income that "Jesus in a Camper Van" garnered, and subsequently, the album was re-issued replacing "Jesus in a Camper Van" with "It's Only Us".

During a show at the Roundhouse London in October 2019, Williams performed the song and also revealed, "That lyric cost me £2.5 million! Truth to God!"

Track listing

All the production done by Guy Chambers and Steve Power.

 MVC stores in the UK offered a free bonus CD with the purchase of either Life Thru a Lens or I've Been Expecting You during Christmas 1999. The album did not contain any unreleased material, but contained twenty-one previously released B-sides and demos from both eras.

Personnel
 Robbie Williams – vocals
Robbie Williams Band
 Guy Chambers – keyboards, organ, vibraphone, synthesizer, acoustic guitar, piano, electric guitar, orchestral samples, bass synth, musical director
 Chris Sharrock – drums
 Fil Eisler – bass, guitar, vocals
 Gary Nuttall – guitar, vocals
 Alex Dickson – guitar, vocals
 "Planet" Claire Worrall – guitar, vocals, keyboards
with:
 David Catlin-Birch – acoustic guitar, bass guitar, backing vocals
 Andy Duncan – percussion, loops
 DJ Slice – scratching
 Jeremy Stacey – drums
 Steve McEwan – acoustic guitar, electric guitar, backing vocals
 André Barreau – acoustic guitar, backing vocals
 Neil Hannon – backing vocals
 Claudia Fontaine – backing vocals
 Bevereley Skeet – backing vocals
 Neil Tennant – backing vocals
 Nicole Patterson – backing vocals
 Nicole Appleton – telephone voice
 Nick Ingham – orchestral arranger
 London Session Orchestra
 Gavin Wright – leader

Charts

Weekly charts

Year-end charts

Certifications and sales

See also
 List of best-selling albums in the United Kingdom

References

1998 albums
Robbie Williams albums
Chrysalis Records albums
Albums recorded at Trident Studios
Albums recorded at Wheeler End Studios